Bidasar is a city and a municipality in Churu district in the state of Rajasthan, India. Bidasar is named after Bidawat Rathores, who descended from Bida, son of Rao Jodha.It is also the birth place of Nahar brothers, founders of Zorko franchise startup.

Geography
It has an average elevation of 304 metres (997 feet). The area is also very sandy and extremely rocky.

Demographics
 India census, Bidasar had a population of 30,103. Males constitute 52% of the population and females 48%. Bidasar has an average literacy rate of 45%, lower than the national average of 59.5%; with male literacy of 56% and female literacy of 34%. 19% of the population is under 6 years of age.

References

Cities and towns in Churu district